The Mount Olive Pickle Company is an American food processing company located in Mount Olive, North Carolina. The company's primary product is pickled cucumbers, but it is also a large supplier of pepper, mixed pickle, relish, and other pickled products.  Mt. Olive is the largest independent pickle company in the United States and the top-selling pickle brand in the Southeastern United States, where its market share approaches 70 percent.

The company employs over 500 people which swells to over 800 during the busiest intake season each summer. In 1943, the company was one of the first in the country to offer profit sharing plans to their employees. In 1959, Mt. Olive established an employee community fund that helped support local community organizations. The Mt. Olive community fund also awards scholarships to employees' children. Each school year the company's community fund awards four scholarships for four different students at $1,500 each.

History
In the mid-1920s, Shikrey Baddour, a Lebanese immigrant from nearby Goldsboro, first saw opportunity in the wasted cucumber crops of area farmers. Baddour came up with the idea of buying the cucumbers, putting them in a brining tank, and selling the brined cucumbers, or brine stock, to other pickle firms. Baddour enlisted the aid of George Moore, a sailor from Wilmington who had worked in a Castle Hayne pickle plant. The plan didn't work the way they had envisioned, however: they had no buyers for their product.
By January 1926, a new plan was put into place through the efforts of a group of Mount Olive business people, led by Headley Morris Cox, who formally established the Mt. Olive Pickle Company, Inc. to pack and sell its own pickles. Thirty-seven original shareholders put forward $19,000 in capital to get the company started in what all viewed as a "community proposition." Many of today's stockholders are grandchildren and great grandchildren of the charter stockholders.
The board of directors hired H.M. Cox as President, Moore as factory superintendent and Baddour as salesman and gave them each shares of stock for their initial investments. The board also purchased  of land from farmer J.A. Westbrook for $1,000. The land is part of the current manufacturing site today. Westbrook's home still stands across from the plant. Mt. Olive surpassed $500,000 in sales in 1942.  The company initiated a profit-sharing plan in 1943 and by 1947 its sales reached more than $1 million a year.

In 1973, Mt. Olive food scientists, working in cooperation with researchers from the United States Department of Agriculture (USDA), discovered one of the secrets of fermentation. The Mt. Olive and USDA researchers discovered that the bacteria L. plantarum was key to the fermentation process, and that purging carbon dioxide from brine with nitrogen led to minimal rot and waste. In 1986, Mt. Olive Pickle co-founded the North Carolina Pickle Festival. In 2008, the company introduced the first single-pack pickles. The intended markets are workers and schoolchildren.

Pickle drop

On December 31, 1999, the Mt. Olive Pickle Company held the first New Year's Eve "pickle drop", in which a glowing green -high pickle is lowered on a flagpole at 7 o'clock EST (midnight Greenwich Mean Time). Guests are provided with hats, noisemakers, and refreshments including cookies, hot chocolate and pickles. The event has turned into an annual occurrence and a source of pride for the community and also benefits the Food Bank of North Carolina through donations of canned goods from guests. The Pickle Drop had its 20th anniversary on December 31, 2019.

Controversy
In October 1998, the Farm Labor Organizing Committee (FLOC), a trade union, announced a boycott of Mt. Olive Pickle Company. The union targeted the pickle processor because it believed that growers would not raise wages unless Mount Olive agreed to pay more for growers' cucumbers.

The union's five-year boycott of Mt. Olive Pickle was ultimately successful. In September 2004, FLOC signed a collective bargaining agreement with Mt. Olive and the growers. More than 6,000 of the state's 10,000 guest workers joined FLOC. More than 1,000 growers agreed to form the North Carolina Growers Association to act as the employers' collective bargaining agent. The Association covered a number of cash crops, such as Christmas trees and tobacco, in addition to cucumbers.

In February 2017, according to a consent agreement, the EPA fined the Mt. Olive Pickle Company $131,856 for violating the Clean Water Act over a quarter-century. Mt. Olive was discharging water with extremely high levels of chloride, ammonia and/or nitrogen.

Notes

References
“20th Annual Mt. Olive's New Year Pickle Drop.” Www.visitnc.com, www.visitnc.com/event/XvGX/20th-annual-mt-olive-s-new-year-pickle-drop.
Carmen, Barbara. "Organizer of Union for Migrant Workers Takes on Pickle Giant." Columbus Dispatch. January 24, 1999.
Etchells, J.L.; Fleming, H.P.; Hontz, L.H.; Bell, T.A.; and Monroe, R.J. "Factors Influencing Bloater Formation in Brined Cucumbers During Controlled Fermentation." Journal of Food Science. 40:3 (1975).
Feehan, Jennifer. "FLOC Claims Victory in North Carolina Arrest Case." Toledo Blade. August 15, 1998.
Franklin, Stephen. "Farm Workers' Group Pushes for Better Pay, Rights." Chicago Tribune. April 8, 2006.
Greenhouse, Steven. "North Carolina Growers' Group Signs Union Contract for Mexican Workers." New York Times. September 17, 2004.
Growing An American Tradition: Mt. Olive Pickle Company: 80 Years. Mt. Olive, N.C.: Mt. Olive Pickle Co., 2006.
Kornegay Jr., George R. "Creating Public-Private Partnerships to Develop Rural and Small Town Infrastructure: USDA RURAL DEVELOPMENT Rural Development and Mount Olive, North Carolina." Agricultural Outlook Forum 2007. March 1, 2007.
Lecker, Kelly. "Major Pickle Firm Faces FLOC Boycott in March." Toledo Blade. October 11, 1998.
Mohan, Anne Marie. "Mt. Olive Packs and Prints Pickles and Peppers." Packaging Digest. September 2005.
“Mount Olive Pickle Employees Community Fund Awards 4 Scholarships.” Sampson Independent, 28 May 2017, www.clintonnc.com/features/lifestyle/20496/mount-olive-pickle-employees-community-fund-awards-4-scholarships.
Sengupta, Somini. "Farm Union Takes Aim At a Big Pickle Maker." New York Times. October 26, 2000.
Sorg, Lisa. “This Week in Pollution: A Big Fine for the Mt. Olive Pickle Company.” The Progressive Pulse, 25 Feb. 2017
"Thousands Turn Out for N.C. Pickle Festival." Goldsboro News-Argus. April 29, 2007.
Zagier, Alan S. "Pickle Protest Planned." Charlotte News and Observer. October 11, 1998.

External links
North Carolina Pickle Festival Web site
Mt. Olive Pickle Company

Companies based in North Carolina
Pickles
1926 establishments in North Carolina
American companies established in 1926
Food and drink companies established in 1926
Condiment companies of the United States